Muhammad Asif Malik is a Pakistani politician who was a Member of the Provincial Assembly of the Punjab, from 2002 to May 2018.

Early life and education
He was born on 2 August 1970 in Khushab.

He graduated from University of the Punjab in 1993. He has the degree of Bachelor of Arts and a degree of the Bachelor of Laws.

Political career
He was elected to the Provincial Assembly of the Punjab as a candidate of Pakistan Muslim League (Q) from Constituency PP-41 (Khushab-III) in 2002 Pakistani general election. He received 19,569 votes and defeated Abdul Rehman Tiwana, an independent candidate.

He was re-elected to the Provincial Assembly of the Punjab as an independent candidate from Constituency PP-41 (Khushab-III) in 2008 Pakistani general election. He received 27,338 votes and defeated Malik Muhammad Ehsan Ullah Tiwana, an independent candidate.

He was re-elected to the Provincial Assembly of the Punjab as a candidate of Pakistan Muslim League (N) (PML-N) from Constituency PP-41 (Khushab-III) in 2013 Pakistani general election. In June 2013, he was inducted into the provincial cabinet of Chief Minister Shahbaz Sharif and was made Provincial Minister of Punjab for Forestry, Wildlife and Fisheries. He remained Minister for Forestry, Wildlife and Fisheries until November 2016. In a cabinet reshuffle in November 2016, he was made Provincial Minister of Punjab for Archaeology.

References

Living people
Punjab MPAs 2013–2018
Punjab MPAs 2002–2007
Punjab MPAs 2008–2013
1970 births
Pakistan Muslim League (N) politicians